Wallace Graham may refer to:
 Wallace H. Graham (1910–1996), Physician to the President 
 Wallace Graham (judge) (1848–1917), Canadian judge
 Wallace Wilson Graham (1815-1898), American politician and lawyer